Willian Patrick Gama Oliveira (born 30 June 2000) is a professional footballer who plays as a forward for Chilean club Santiago Wanderers. Born in Brazil, he is a youth international for Chile.

Club career
He joined Youth Team of Santiago Wanderers at the age of 11. Even though he was promoted to the professional squad at the age of 17 in September 2017, he made his official debut in a 2018 Primera B match against Unión San Felipe. Along with Santiago Wanderers, he got promotion to Chilean Primera División after becoming 2019 Primera B champion.

International career
He has represented Chile U17 at two friendly matches against USA U17, at the 2017 South American U-17 Championship – Chile was the runner-up – and at the 2017 FIFA U-17 World Cup.

Also, he played all the matches for Chile U17 at the friendly tournament Lafarge Foot Avenir 2017 in France, better known as Tournament Limoges, where Chile became champion after defeating Belgium U18 and Poland U18 and drawing France U18.

Personal life
Born in Brazil to Brazilian parents, he came to Chile along with his mother at the age of 9, arriving in San Felipe. Later, he acquired the Chilean nationality on 2014.

Honours

Club
Santiago Wanderers
Primera B: 2019

International
Chile U17
Tournoi de Limoges: 2017

References

External links
 

2000 births
Living people
Sportspeople from Rio Grande do Sul
Chilean footballers
Chile youth international footballers
Brazilian footballers
Brazilian emigrants to Chile
Chilean people of Brazilian descent
Naturalized citizens of Chile
Primera B de Chile players
Chilean Primera División players
Santiago Wanderers footballers
Association football forwards